Reynaldo Parks Pérez (born December 4, 1974) is a Costa Rican former football defender.

Club career
He has played in different teams in Costa Rica, as well as in Mexico and Guatemala. He started out in Costa Rica with his hometown team Limonense, and was later transferred to Herediano. Then he went on to play alongside compatriot Fernando Patterson with Municipal in Guatemala and Jaguares de Colima and Tecos UAG in Mexico, before coming back to Costa Rica to play for Saprissa and Universidad.

Parks was part of the team that played the 2005 FIFA Club World Championship Toyota Cup, where Saprissa finished third behind São Paulo and Liverpool.

In 2008, he moved to San Carlos and retired in November 2009.

International career
Parks made his debut for Costa Rica in a February 1993 UNCAF Nations Cup qualification match against Nicaragua and earned a total of 43 caps, scoring 1 goal. He represented his country in 15 FIFA World Cup qualification matches and played at the 1995 and 1999 UNCAF Nations Cups as well as at the 1993 and 2002 CONCACAF Gold Cups and the 2001 Copa América. Parks was a key member of the national team that qualified for the 2002 FIFA World Cup, serving as the captain. But just before the event started, a knee injury kept him away of participating and he was replaced by Pablo Chinchilla.

His final international was an October 2003 friendly match against South Africa.

International goals
Scores and results list Costa Rica's goal tally first.

Retirement
After retiring, Parks became chairman of the National Costa Rica Football Players Association but resigned from his post after 7 years in January 2014.

Personal life
Parks is married to Irma Loáiciga and they have two sons. His cousin Winston Parks also played for the Costa Rica national team.

Honours
Primera División de Costa Rica
2003–04, 2005–06, 2006–07

CONCACAF Champions' Cup
2005

Copa Interclubes UNCAF
2003

References

External links
 
 2002 World Cup profile - Nación 
 

1974 births
Living people
People from Limón Province
Association football defenders
Costa Rican footballers
Costa Rica international footballers
1993 CONCACAF Gold Cup players
1995 UNCAF Nations Cup players
2001 Copa América players
2002 CONCACAF Gold Cup players
C.S. Herediano footballers
C.S.D. Municipal players
Tecos F.C. footballers
Deportivo Saprissa players
C.F. Universidad de Costa Rica footballers
A.D. San Carlos footballers
Liga FPD players
Liga MX players
Costa Rican expatriate footballers
Expatriate footballers in Guatemala
Expatriate footballers in Mexico
Costa Rican expatriate sportspeople in Guatemala
Costa Rican expatriate sportspeople in Mexico
Copa Centroamericana-winning players